Gold Coast may refer to:

Places

Africa
 Gold Coast (region), in West Africa, which was made up of the following colonies, before being established as the independent nation of Ghana:
 Portuguese Gold Coast (Portuguese, 1482–1642)
 Dutch Gold Coast (Dutch, 1598–1872)
 Swedish Gold Coast (Swedes, 1650–1658; 1660–1663)
 Danish Gold Coast (Denmark-Norway, 1658–1850)
 Brandenburger Gold Coast and Prussian Gold Coast (Germans, 1682–1721)
 Gold Coast (British colony) (English, 1821–1957)

Asia
 Hong Kong Gold Coast, a private housing estate in Hong Kong

Australia
 Gold Coast, Queensland, a city in the state of Queensland
 City of Gold Coast, a local government area spanning the Gold Coast and surrounding areas
 Gold Coast Parklands, a greyhound and harness racing complex in Queensland
 Gold Coast Regional Botanic Gardens, in Benowa, Gold Coast
 Gold Coast Titans, an NRL team
 Gold Coast Suns, an AFL team
 Gold Coast United FC, a former A-League team

Europe
 Costa Daurada, an area on the coast of Catalonia, Spain
 Goldcoast (Switzerland), the lower eastern shore of the Lake of Zürich
 "Gold Coast", a popular name for the harbour street and amusement mile "Schiffbrücke" in Flensburg, Germany

North America
 Gold Coast, California, a nickname for Ventura, California, U.S.
 Gold Coast, Orange County, a region also called Orange Coast in California, US
 Gold Coast (Connecticut), the southern portion of Fairfield County, Connecticut, US
 Gold Coast (New Jersey), U.S.
 Gold Coast (Washington), U.S.
 Gold Coast, Long Island, a nickname for the North Shore, New York, US
 Gold Coast Historic District (Chicago), Illinois, US
 Gold Coast Historic District (Omaha, Nebraska), US
 Old Gold Coast, Omaha, Nebraska, US
 Lakewood Gold Coast, Ohio, US
 The Miami metropolitan area, which is nicknamed Florida's Gold Coast

South America
 Costa de Oro, a group of resort towns and beaches in Uruguay
 Ocumare de la Costa de Oro Municipality, a municipality in Venezuela

Art, entertainment, and media

Broadcasting
 Gold Coast Broadcasting, a radio broadcasting company in California, United States

Literature
 Gold Coast (novel), a 1980 novel by Elmore Leonard
 The Gold Coast (Robinson novel), a 1988 novel by Kim Stanley Robinson
 The Gold Coast (DeMille novel), a 1990 novel by Nelson DeMille

Music
 Gold Coast (album), a 1977 album by John Coltrane and Wilbur Harden

Periodicals
 Gold Coast (magazine), Fort Lauderdale, Florida, US
 Gold Coast Bulletin, the principal daily newspaper of Australia's Gold Coast City
 Gold Coast Mail, a newspaper published in Queensland, Australia

Sports

Australia
 Gold Coast Blaze, a former basketball team in the National Basketball League (NBL).
 Gold Coast Blue Tongues, a former semi-professional ice hockey team in the Australian Ice Hockey League
 Gold Coast Breakers, a rugby union club, based at Bond University, Gold Coast, Queensland
 Gold Coast Chargers, a former rugby league club in New South Wales
 Gold Coast Classic (tennis), a precursor to the Brisbane International tournament, Queensland, Australia
 Gold Coast Clippers, a foundation team in the now-defunct Australian Baseball League
 Gold Coast Cougars, a former Australian baseball team
 Gold Coast Football Club, a football club in the Australian Football League (AFL)
 Gold Coast Hawks, a team in the Bowls Premier League in Australia and New Zealand
 Gold Coast Marathon, a race on the Gold Coast, Queensland, Australia
 Gold Coast Rollers (NBL), a former basketball team in the National Basketball League (NBL)
 Gold Coast Rollers (QBL), a basketball team in the Queensland Basketball League (QBL)
 Gold Coast Titans, a rugby league football club the National Rugby League (NRL)
 Gold Coast United FC, an A-League football team based on the Gold Coast
 Gold Coast Vikings, a rugby league team that competed in the Queensland State League and the Queensland Cup competitions
 Tennis Gold Coast, the governing body for the sport of tennis in the Gold Coast, Queensland

Sports in other places
 Golden Coast Conference, a U.S. college sports conference
 Gold Coast Suns (baseball), a team in the Senior Professional Baseball Association, Florida, US

Structures
 Gold Coast Hospital, a former hospital in the Gold Coast, Queensland, Australia
 Gold Coast Hotel and Casino, a hotel and casino located in Las Vegas, Nevada, US
 Gold Coast Stadium (disambiguation)

Transportation
 Gold Coast Airport, an Australian domestic and international airport on the Gold Coast
 Gold Coast Highway, an Australian highway
 Gold Coast Oceanway, a shared use pedestrian and cyclist pathway between New South Wales and Queensland, Australia
 Gold Coast railway line, connects Brisbane with the Queensland Gold Coast in Australia
 Gold Coast Rapid Transit, a proposed rail transportation system for Queensland, Australia
 Gold Coast Seaway, the main shipping channel for the Gold Coast Broadwater in Australia
 Gold Coast (train), a passenger train in the United States
 Gold Coast Transit, a bus operator in California, United States

Vessels
 HMS Gold Coast, a name held briefly by the British frigate HMS Labuan

See also
 Gold Coast ackey, a currency issued for the Gold Coast by the British between 1796 and 1818
 Gold Coast Historic District (disambiguation)
 Golden Coast (disambiguation)
 Gould Coast, Antarctica